Thomas Albert Bradshaw Nuttall (February 1889 – October 1963) was an English professional footballer who played as a forward in the Football League for Southend United, Everton and Manchester United.

Personal life 
Nuttall served as a lance bombardier in the Royal Garrison Artillery during the First World War.

Career statistics

References 

1889 births
1963 deaths
Footballers from Bolton
English footballers
Association football forwards
Heywood United F.C. players
Everton F.C. players
Manchester United F.C. players
English Football League players
Northwich Victoria F.C. players
Rochdale A.F.C. players
St Mirren F.C. players
Scottish Football League players
Southend United F.C. players
Eccles United F.C. players
Chorley F.C. players
British Army personnel of World War I
Royal Garrison Artillery soldiers
Association football inside forwards
Military personnel from Lancashire